Dean Schmeichel (born 10 October 1973) is a Canadian wrestler. He competed in the men's freestyle 97 kg at the 2000 Summer Olympics.

References

1973 births
Living people
Canadian male sport wrestlers
Olympic wrestlers of Canada
Wrestlers at the 2000 Summer Olympics
People from Tisdale, Saskatchewan
Commonwealth Games gold medallists for Canada
Commonwealth Games medallists in wrestling
Pan American Games medalists in wrestling
Pan American Games bronze medalists for Canada
Wrestlers at the 1999 Pan American Games
Medalists at the 1999 Pan American Games
Wrestlers at the 2002 Commonwealth Games
20th-century Canadian people
Medallists at the 2002 Commonwealth Games